Chromium chloride may refer to:

Chromium(II) chloride, also known as chromous chloride
Chromium(III) chloride, also known as chromic chloride or chromium trichloride
Chromium(IV) chloride, unstable